Charles Henry Phillips (February 21, 1824January 1, 1879) was an American farmer, politician, and Wisconsin pioneer.  He served three terms in the Wisconsin State Assembly, representing Jefferson County, and was elected to the Wisconsin State Senate, but died before the start of the legislative session.

Biography
Phillips was born Charles Henry Phillips on February 21, 1824, in Westmoreland, New York. He moved to Lake Mills, Wisconsin, in 1849. Phillips was a farmer and livestock dealer. He was elected to the Wisconsin State Assembly for the 1870, 1876, and 1877 sessions, running on the Republican Party ticket.

He was elected to the Wisconsin State Senate in the 1878 general election, but died on January 1, 1879, technically the first day of his term, but before the start of the legislative session.

Electoral history

Wisconsin Assembly (1869)

| colspan="6" style="text-align:center;background-color: #e9e9e9;"| General Election, November 2, 1869

Wisconsin Assembly (1875, 1876)

| colspan="6" style="text-align:center;background-color: #e9e9e9;"| General Election, November 2, 1875

| colspan="6" style="text-align:center;background-color: #e9e9e9;"| General Election, November 7, 1876

Wisconsin Senate (1878)

| colspan="6" style="text-align:center;background-color: #e9e9e9;"| General Election, November 5, 1878

References

External links
 

People from Westmoreland, New York
People from Lake Mills, Wisconsin
Republican Party Wisconsin state senators
Republican Party members of the Wisconsin State Assembly
1824 births
1879 deaths
19th-century American politicians